Elliott Earl Williams (born 1974) was a US Army veteran who died in the Tulsa County, Oklahoma jail on October 27, 2011. The medical examiner determined in a 2014 report that he died from "complications of vertebrospinal injuries due to blunt force trauma", starvation, and dehydration. Special Administrator Robbie Emery Burke, representing the Estate of Mr. Williams, filed a lawsuit on April 16, 2012, against Sheriff Stanley Glanz, Correctional Healthcare Management of Oklahoma, Inc., et al. The Claims for Relief pertain to Cruel and Unusual Punishment in Violation of the Eighth Amendment and/or the Fourteenth Amendment of the United States Constitution; and Wrongful Death.

Jailing
On October 21, 2011, Mr. Williams was arrested by Owasso police in the lobby of a Marriott hotel in Owasso, Oklahoma for misdemeanor obstruction of a police officer; he was subsequently transported to Tulsa County jail on October 22, 2011.

While Mr. Williams was in his cell, incapacitated, food and water were brought to him, but he was unable to reach them; jail officials taunted him and accused him of faking his injuries.

Aftermath 
In December 2011, Mr. Earl and Mrs. Katha Williams, the parents of the deceased, sued the city of Owasso for records related to the arrest of their son; the suit was predicated on a violation of Oklahoma's Open Records Act. Ms. Elia Lara-Williams, wife of the late Mr. Williams, filed suit against Sheriff Stanley Glanz and the medical staff of the Tulsa County jail.

Oklahoma State Bureau of Investigation: Suspicious death report 
The Oklahoma State Bureau of Investigation conducted an investigation into the death of Mr. Williams from 14 November 2011 through 31 December 2011.

The subsequent report summarized the pertinent events as follows:

This report was later filed with the court presiding over the Burke v. Glanz case on April 1, 2014.

Civil lawsuit: Burke v. Glanz
In July 2016, U.S. District Judge John Dowdell ruled that a federal civil rights lawsuit against former Sheriff Stanley Glanz and Tulsa County officials could proceed. In February 2017, defense attorneys for Sheriff Vic Regalado and Mr. Glanz filed a motion accusing Judge Dowell of failing to disclose a conflict of interest, which Judge Dowell subsequently denied.

In March 2017, Judge Dowell ruled in favor of the plaintiffs, requiring Tulsa County and former Sheriff Stanley Glanz to pay $10.2 million and $250,000, respectively, to the Estate of Mr. Elliott Williams.

Following challenges by attorneys for Mr. Glanz and Tulsa County, the 10th U.S. Circuit Court of Appeals upheld most of Judge Dowell's ruling on August 20, 2019.

Expert reports

Psychiatrist Steven Hoge, MD
Dr. Hoge, retained by law firm Smolen Smolen & Roytman on behalf of Ms. Burkey, was also asked to review evidential records and to "render an opinion regarding the mental health care of Elliott Earl Williams at the time of his arrest and during his incarceration at the Owasso County Jail and the David L. Moss Criminal Justice Center ..." In his report, Dr. Hoge concludes the following:

Medical Examiner Scott A. Allen, MD
Dr. Allen, on behalf of Ms. Burke's attorneys, conducted a review of evidential records relating to the medical care of Mr. Williams while in custody of the David L. Moss Criminal Justice Center. Dr. Allen concluded, in part, that Mr. Williams died "not only from lack of medical care, but also from lack of food and water, all while under the care of licensed health professionals."

Corporal Billy McKelvey 
Corporal McKelvey was tasked with determining whether any TSCO employee violated policies, willfully or otherwise, that contributed to the death of Mr. Williams; and, what actions were taken by Correctional Healthcare Companies, Inc employees. In his report, which includes numerous interviews of inmates, detention officers, medical professionals, and others.

See also
Death of Darren Rainey
Death of Sandra Bland
Death of Kristiana Coignard

References

2011 deaths
Deaths in police custody in the United States
1974 births
Tulsa County, Oklahoma
Penal system in Oklahoma